The band-tailed fruiteater (Pipreola intermedia) is a species of bird in the family Cotingidae. It is found at high altitudes in the subtropical and tropical moist montane forests of Bolivia and Peru. It is a plump green bird with chevron-shaped markings on the flanks and a tail with a black band and white tip. Males have a black head and bib and a narrow yellow collar, while females lack these features. Both sexes have red beaks and legs. This is a relatively common species with a wide range, and the International Union for Conservation of Nature has rated its conservation status as being "least concern".

Description

The adult male has a black head glossed with green, and a black bib. The bib is surrounded by a bright yellow margin. The upper parts of the body are mid-green, and there are black, chevron-shaped markings on the flanks. The tail has a green base, a black band and a whitish tip. The underparts are yellowish, mottled or streaked with green. The female resembles the male but lacks the glossy black head, the black bib and the yellow collar, and the black bar on the tail may be fainter. Both male and female have a yellow iris and a red beak and legs. This bird is very similar to the green-and-black fruiteater but that species is smaller, the bib is suffused with green and the yellow area surrounding it is less distinct.

Distribution
This is a bird of the mountain forests clothing the eastern flanks of the Andes in South America. At the southern end of its range it may be found at lower altitudes. It is usually present at higher elevations than the green-and-black fruiteater.

Status
The population trend of the band-tailed fruiteater appears to be stable, the birds have a large range and are fairly common. For these reasons, the International Union for Conservation of Nature has assessed their conservation status as being of "least concern".

References

band-tailed fruiteater
Birds of the Bolivian Andes
Birds of the Peruvian Andes
band-tailed fruiteater
band-tailed fruiteater
Taxonomy articles created by Polbot